Erythronium multiscapideum is a California species of flowering plant in the lily family which is known by the common name Sierra fawn lily.

It is endemic to California, where it grows in the foothills of the southern Cascade Range and the Sierra Nevada. Its primary range extends from Shasta County to Amador County with additional populations in Mariposa County.

Description
Erythronium multiscapideum produces a bulb two to five centimeters long, sometimes with associated bulblets. It has two oval-shaped leaves up to 15 centimeters long which are green and mottled with brown or white. Stalks about 10 to 20 centimeters tall hold one to four flowers each. The flower has white tepals with bright yellow bases. The stamens, anthers, and stigma are white or cream.

References

External links
Jepson Manual Treatment - Erythronium multiscapoideum
United States Department of Agriculture Plants Profile: Erythronium multiscapoideum
Erythronium multiscapoideum - Calphotos Photo gallery

multiscapideum
Endemic flora of California
Flora of the Cascade Range
Flora of the Sierra Nevada (United States)
Plants described in 1855
Taxa named by Aven Nelson
Flora without expected TNC conservation status